The 2008 NHK Trophy was the final event of six in the 2008–09 ISU Grand Prix of Figure Skating, a senior-level international invitational competition series. It was held at the Yoyogi National Gymnasium in Tokyo on November 27–30. Medals were awarded in the disciplines of men's singles, ladies' singles, pair skating, and ice dancing. Skaters earned points toward qualifying for the 2008–09 Grand Prix Final. The compulsory dance was the Paso Doble.

Schedule
(Japan local time, UTC+9)

 Friday, November 28
 14:15 Ice dancing - Compulsory dance
 15:35 Pairs - Short program
 17:00 Men - Short program
 18:55 Ladies - Short program
 20:45 Ice dancing - Original dance
 Saturday, November 29
 14:15 Pairs - Free skating
 15:56 Ice dancing - Free skating
 18:42 Ladies - Free skating
 Sunday, November 30
 13:00 Men - Free skating
 16:00 Gala exhibition

Results

Men

Ladies

Pairs

Ice dancing

External links

 
 2008 NHK Trophy at the Japan Skating Federation
 
 
 
 
 

Nhk Trophy, 2008
NHK Trophy
NHK Trophy